The abduction and killing of Nissim Toledano began on 13 December 1992, when a squad of Hamas abducted Israeli border policeman Senior Sergeant Nissim Toledano in Lod. Although the captors demanded the release of Hamas leader Sheikh Ahmed Yassin for Toledano, Toledano was killed by his captors.

Background 
In 1987, during the First Intifada, Hamas carried out its first attack against Israel in which two Israeli soldiers were abducted and killed. The Israel Defense Forces immediately arrested the founder of Hamas Sheikh Ahmed Yassin, and sentenced him to life in prison for masterminding terrorist attacks. Hamas then began planning the capture of an Israeli soldier in order to seek the release of Yassin in a swap.

Capture and killing 
At about 4:30 am, 13 December 1992, a squad of Hamas militants kidnapped 29-year-old Israeli border policeman Senior Sergeant Nissim Toledano in Lod, as he walked from his home to attend his administrative job.

During the same day Hamas demanded that Sheikh Ahmed Yassin be released the same day until 9:00 pm in exchange for Toledano. Toledano's captors threatened to kill Toledano unless Yasin would be freed. Israel refused to negotiate until it received evidence that Toledano was alive and well.

Two days later, on 15 December 1992, Toledano's body was discovered near the communal Israeli settlement in the West Bank Kfar Adumim. Toledano's body was found bound and stabbed. Pathological findings indicated that Toledano was murdered two-to-six hours after the ultimatum expired. In addition, the findings indicated that the strangulation and stab wounds were not carried out at the site at which Toledano's body was discovered.

Israel's response 
A few months after the event, the IDF arrested Toledano's kidnappers and killers. They were Mahmoud Issa, Majid Abu Qatish, Mahmoud Atwan, and Musa al-Akari. They were tried, convicted, and sentenced to life imprisonment. Mahmoud Issa was held in solitary confinement and for ten years between 2002 and 2012. By the time he was taken out of solitary confinement he had spent more time in solitary confinement and had been refused family visits longer than any other Palestinian prisoner. 

In response to the killing, Israel arrested about 1,200 Palestinian fundamentalists, mostly Hamas and Islamic Jihad members, including 22 members of the Izz al-Din al Qassam Brigades, during a huge manhunt operation in the Gaza Strip and the West Bank. In order to deepen the damage to Hamas' infrastructure and to its members, Israel decided, in an unprecedented step, to expel hundreds of Palestinian militants to Lebanon for a period of two years.

To this end, on 17 December 1992, Israel expelled 415 leading figures of Hamas and Islamic Jihad to Marj al-Zohour in southern Lebanon, beyond the Israeli Security Zone. Among the more prominent deportees were Mahmoud al-Zahar, Abd al-Aziz Rantisi, Ismail Haniyeh, Said Siam Izz El-Deen Sheikh Khalil, Abbedallah Qawasameh, Aziz Duwaik, and Nayef Rajoub.

The planned deportation gained wide media coverage, which led the Lebanese authorities to prepare in advance for the event. They prevented the deportees from entering the country, thereby forcing the deportees to stay in a desolate buffer strip between the nearest Lebanese and Israeli army checkpoints. The deportees set up a tent camp from which they received wide international media attention and coverage.

In February 1993, Israel shortened the deportees' period of expulsion to one year only. Most of the deportees returned to the West Bank and the Gaza Strip after the period of expulsion ended.

See also
2014 kidnapping and murder of Israeli teenagers, by Hamas
Kidnapping and murder of Yaron Chen, by Hamas
Kidnapping and murder of Avi Sasportas and Ilan Saadon, by Hamas
Kidnapping and murder of Nachshon Wachsman, by Hamas

References

1990s missing person cases
Deaths by person in Asia
Formerly missing people
Israeli military casualties
Israeli prisoners of war
Israeli soldiers
People of the Israeli–Palestinian conflict